The 2022 Arab Cup U-20 is an international youth football tournament held in Saudi Arabia from 20 July to 6 August 2022. The 18 national teams involved in the tournament were required to register a squad of 23 players, including three goalkeepers. Only players in these squads were eligible to take part in the tournament. Players born on or after 1 January 2002 are eligible to participate.

The age listed for each player is on 20 July 2022, the first day of the tournament. The numbers of caps and goals listed for each player do not include any matches played after the start of the tournament. The club listed is the club for which the player last played a competitive match prior to the tournament. The nationality for each club reflects the national association (not the league) to which the club is affiliated. A flag is included for coaches who are of a different nationality than their own national team.

Group A

Saudi Arabia
Coach: Saleh Al-Mohammadi

Iraq
Coach: Emad Mohammed

Mauritania
Coach:

Group B

United Arab Emirates
Coach:

Jordan
Coach:

Yemen
Coach:

Group C

Algeria
Coach: Mohamed Lacete

Libya
Coach:

Lebanon
Coach: Bilal Fleifel

Group D

Egypt
Coach:

Somalia
Coach:

Oman
Coach:

Group E

Tunisia
Coach:

Djibouti
Coach:

Bahrain
Coach:

Group F

Morocco
Coach:
لاعبين باقل من 18 سنة

Palestine
Coach: Husam Younis

Sudan
Coach:

Notes

References 

Arab Cup U-20